This list of museums in North Carolina is a list of museums, defined for this context as institutions (including nonprofit organizations, government entities, and private businesses) that collect and care for objects of cultural, artistic, scientific, or historical interest and make their collections or related exhibits available for public viewing. Museums that exist only in cyberspace (i.e., virtual museums) are not included.

Museums

Defunct museums
 Appalachian Cultural Museum, Boone, part of Appalachian State University, exhibits closed in 2006 but remain online
 Chapel Hill Museum, Chapel Hill, closed in 2010
 Charlotte Trolley Museum, Charlotte
 Charlotte-Mecklenburg Fire Education Center and Museum, Charlotte, closed in 2009
 Cleveland County Historical Museum, Shelby, closed in 2012, site now home to the Earl Scruggs Center
 Doll & Miniature Museum of High Point, closed in 2012
 Fayetteville Museum of Art, Fayetteville, closed in 2010
 Grimes Mill, Salisbury, destroyed by fire in 2013
 Health Adventure, Asheville, closed in 2013
 LATIBAH Collard Green Museum, Charlotte, closed in 2015, currently no physical site
 Latta House, Raleigh, destroyed by fire in 2007
 Maimy Etta Black Fine Arts Museum and Historical Society, Forest City, destroyed by fire, March 2009, "WNC Profile:  Mamie Thompson Gumbs", WNC Magazine, January 2009, NC ECHO museum information and photos
 Mountain Farm & Home Museum, Hendersonville
 Sparta Teapot Museum of Craft and Design, Sparta, closed in 2010

See also
 Aquaria in North Carolina (category)
 List of museums in the United States
 List of nature centers in North Carolina
 Observatories in North Carolina (category)

References

Resources
 North Carolina Museums Council
 North Carolina Exploring Cultural Heritage Online - includes listings and photos of NC museums
 Learn NC

North Carolina
Museums
Museums